Gorka Iturraspe Derteano (born 3 May 1994) is a Spanish professional footballer who plays for SD Amorebieta as a central midfielder.

Club career

Athletic Bilbao
Born in Abadiño, Biscay, Iturraspe began his career in the youth ranks of Athletic Bilbao. He suffered from persistent hip injuries which hampered his development, although he was still able to feature in the final of the 2013 Copa del Rey Juvenil.

After one year with the farm team, Iturraspe made his debut for the reserves on 7 September 2014, playing the final 15 minutes of the 5–1 home Segunda División B rout of SD Leioa in place of Néstor Salinas. On 17 May 2015, the last game of the season, he scored his first goal, in a 2–2 draw against SD Huesca at the Estadio El Alcoraz; his team gained promotion via the play-offs, in which he netted in a 2–0 first round victory over CF Villanovense.

Iturraspe played his first match in a professional league on 30 August 2015, when he started in a 2–1 Segunda División defeat away to Elche CF. He went on to feature regularly during the campaign, although always being replaced or coming on as a substitute due to his physical problems; after they were relegated, he remained with the B side the following season, again making several appearances but never completing 90 minutes.

Later career
Iturraspe's contract with Athletic was terminated in summer 2017, and he moved to third-division club SD Amorebieta. He scored five goals in 2018–19, the first being on 9 February 2019 in a 1–1 home draw against Gimnástica de Torrelavega.

On 18 July 2019, Iturraspe signed for CD Atlético Baleares still in the third tier. Thirteen months later, after play-off defeat to FC Cartagena on penalties, he joined CF Rayo Majadahonda. 

After two years in the Community of Madrid, Iturraspe returned to Amorebieta.

Personal life
Iturraspe's older brother, Ander, also became a professional in the same position. He too came through at Athletic, and went on to represent Spain internationally. While Ander was a long-time teammate of Markel Susaeta, Gorka signed for Rayo Majadahonda alongside the latter's cousin Néstor.

References

External links

1994 births
Living people
People from Abadiño
Sportspeople from Biscay
Spanish footballers
Footballers from the Basque Country (autonomous community)
Association football midfielders
Segunda División players
Segunda División B players
Tercera División players
Primera Federación players
CD Basconia footballers
Bilbao Athletic footballers
Athletic Bilbao footballers
SD Amorebieta footballers
CD Atlético Baleares footballers
CF Rayo Majadahonda players